Club Atlético Pilsen Callao (sometimes referred as Pilsen Callao) is a Peruvian football club, playing in the city of Dulanto, Callao, Peru.

History
The Club Atlético Pilsen Callao was founded on April 28, 1976.

In 2007 Copa Perú, the club classified to the Regional Stage, but was eliminated by Óscar Benavides in the First Stage.

In 2008 Copa Perú, the club classified to the Regional Stage, but was eliminated by Unión Supe in the First Stage.

In 2009 Copa Perú, the club classified to the Regional Stage, but was eliminated by La Rural in the Semifinals.

In 2010 Copa Perú, the club classified to the Regional Stage, but was eliminated when finished in 6th place.

In 2017 Copa Perú, the club classified to the Departamental Stage, but was eliminated in the Group Stage.

Honours

Regional
Liga Departamental de Callao:
Winners (1): 2009
Runner-up (3): 2007, 2008, 2010

Liga Superior de Callao:
Winners (2): 2010, 2011

Liga Intradistrital de Dulanto:
Winners (4): 2007, 2008, 2009, 2017
Runner-up (1): 2006

See also
List of football clubs in Peru
Peruvian football league system

References

External links
 
 

Football clubs in Peru
Association football clubs established in 1976